Aaron McCusker is a Northern Irish actor. He is best known for his portrayal of Jamie Maguire in the Channel 4's television series Shameless and Jim Hutton, Freddie Mercury's boyfriend, in the 2018 feature film Bohemian Rhapsody.

Early life
McCusker was born in Portadown, County Armagh. He was a member of the local drama group called The Phoenix Players.

Career
From 2007-2013, McCusker starred as Jamie Maguire in 108 episodes of Shameless. He appeared in Ultimate Force, The Bill and a TV adaptation of Jonathan Coe's novel The Rotters' Club. 

McCusker starred in the video for the song "Making Money" by Microlip. He played serial killer AJ Yates in season eight of Dexter. He portrayed astronaut Wally Schirra in the ABC series The Astronaut Wives Club. He played Jason Donnelly in the psychological thriller Fortitude. On 18 April 2016, he appeared as Wesley, an MI6 agent, on the American police drama Castle (episode: "Backstabber"). McCusker played Freddie Mercury's boyfriend Jim Hutton in the biopic Bohemian Rhapsody (2018).

In 2020, McCusker starred as Finn Maguire in the third series of British Nordic noir detective series Marcella.

Personal life
In April 2009 McCusker married his long-term girlfriend, Jennie Sutton at Beamish Hall, a country house hotel.

McCusker lives in Hale, Trafford. McCusker is a supporter of both Liverpool and Celtic.

Filmography

Film

Television

Theatre credits

References

External links 
 

Male television actors from Northern Ireland
Living people
People from Portadown
Year of birth missing (living people)